Alan Kimber (1949 – 6 September 2012) was an English international swimmer.

Swimming career
He won a silver medal in the 1500 m freestyle at the 1966 European Aquatics Championships.

He started swimming aged 14, at Southampton Swimming Club, where he later coached after retirement from competitions. He missed the 1968 Summer Olympics due to a shoplifting conviction. Two years later he was expelled from the national team after an incident of noisy disturbance.

At the ASA National British Championships he won the 220 yards freestyle title in 1966, the 440 yards freestyle in 1966 and 1967, the 1966, 1967 and 1968 880 yards freestyle title  and the 1650 yards freestyle titles in 1967 and 1968. He also won the 220 yards medley title in 1966 and the 440 yards medley title in 1966, 1967, and 1968.

Personal life
He was married twice and had four sons: Anthony (b. 1974), Stuart (b. 1976), Ryan (b. 1978) and Andrew (b. 1987) and two daughters Kathryn (b. 1980) and Ann (b. 1984). He died of cancer three weeks after being hospitalized.

References

1949 births
2012 deaths
English male swimmers
European Aquatics Championships medalists in swimming